Word Power may refer to:

Reader's Digest National Word Power Challenge
Word Power, a dice and card game published by Avalon Hill in 1963
Word Power Books, a radical bookshop and publisher based in Edinburgh, Scotland.
Word Power (album)
Wordpower, Vol. 2: Directrix, albums by Divine Styler